This is a list of municipalities in Belarus which have standing links to local communities in other countries known as "town twinning" (usually in Europe) or "sister cities" (usually in the rest of the world).

B
Babruysk

 Anenii Noi, Moldova
 Comrat, Moldova
 Daugavpils, Latvia
 Grozny, Russia
 Hengyang, China
 Iglesias, Italy
 Ishim, Russia
 Kobuleti, Georgia
 Kolpino, Russia
 Kostroma, Russia
 Luga, Russia
 Morogoro, Tanzania
 Murom, Russia
 Naro-Fominsk, Russia
 Novomoskovsk, Russia
 Oskemen, Kazakhstan
 Petrogradsky (Saint Petersburg), Russia
 Púchov, Slovakia
 Sevlievo, Bulgaria
 Sokolniki (Moscow), Russia
 Talin, Armenia
 Vladimir, Russia
 Warsaw West County, Poland

Baranavichy

 Biała Podlaska, Poland
 Chibi, China
 Kaliningrad, Russia
 Karlovo, Bulgaria
 Kineshma, Russia
 Konyaaltı, Turkey
 Magadan, Russia
 Mytishchi, Russia
 Nacka, Sweden
 Poltava, Ukraine
 Solntsevo (Moscow), Russia
 Stockerau, Austria
 Sulęcin County, Poland
 Vasileostrovsky (Saint Petersburg), Russia
 Yeysky District, Russia

Barysaw

 Bila Tserkva, Ukraine
 Gagarin, Russia
 Maloyaroslavets, Russia
 Melitopol, Ukraine
 Mytishchi, Russia
 Narva, Estonia
 Noginsk, Russia
 Podolsk, Russia
 Yelets, Russia
 Yeysk, Russia

Brest

 Ashdod, Israel
 Astrakhan, Russia
 Baienfurt, Germany
 Baindt, Germany
 Baiyin, China
 Batumi, Georgia
 Berg, Germany
 Biała Podlaska, Poland
 Coevorden, Netherlands
 Dorogomilovo (Moscow), Russia
 Ivano-Frankivsk, Ukraine
 Izhevsk, Russia
 Kaliningrad, Russia
 Kovrov, Russia
 Lutsk, Ukraine
 Malgobek, Russia
 Nakhchivan, Azerbaijan
 Nevsky (Saint Petersburg), Russia
 Nizhny Tagil, Russia
 Novorossiysk, Russia
 Petrozavodsk, Russia
 Port-sur-Saône, France
 Ravensburg, Germany
 Ryazan, Russia
 Siedlce County, Poland
 Subotica, Serbia
 Terespol, Poland
 Tyumen, Russia
 Weingarten, Germany
 Xiaogan, China

G
Gomel

 Anapa, Russia
 Armavir, Russia
 Bryansk, Russia
 Burgas, Bulgaria
 Chengdu, China
 Chernihiv, Ukraine
 Cheryomushki (Moscow), Russia
 Clermont-Ferrand, France
 Dnipro, Ukraine
 Donetsk, Ukraine
 Fort Myers, United States
 Harbin, China
 Huai'an, China
 Kaliningrad, Russia
 Krasnoselsky (Saint Petersburg), Russia
 Kurgan, Russia
 Kursk, Russia
 Kutaisi, Georgia
 Magnitogorsk, Russia
 Novi Sad, Serbia
 Omsk, Russia
 Protvino, Russia
 Rostov-on-Don, Russia
 Samara, Russia
 Solomianskyi (Kyiv), Ukraine
 Ulyanovsk, Russia
 Vasileostrovsky (Saint Petersburg), Russia
 Voronezh, Russia

Grodno

 Ashkelon, Israel
 Cheboksary, Russia
 Dzerzhinsk, Russia
 Khimki, Russia
 Kraljevo, Serbia
 Limoges, France
 Minden, Germany
 Qabala District, Azerbaijan
 Shchukino (Moscow), Russia
 Tambov, Russia
 Tuapsinsky District, Russia
 Vologda, Russia

I
Iwye

 Aznakayevo, Russia

 Sokółka, Poland

K
Kapyl

 Chekhovsky District, Russia

 Matveyevo-Kurgansky District, Russia
 Tsentralny (Minsk), Belarus
 Wanzhou (Chongqing), China

Karelichy

 Krasnogorsk, Russia
 Mitino (Moscow), Russia
 Tukums, Latvia

Krupki

 Gagarin, Russia
 Solnechnogorsk, Russia

L
Lida

 Daugavpils, Latvia
 Dimitrovgrad, Russia
 Goychay, Azerbaijan
 Kalachinsky District, Russia
 Khoroshyovo-Mnyovniki (Moscow), Russia
 Krymsky District, Russia
 Lebedyansky District, Russia
 Lyuberetsky District, Russia
 Nemansky District, Russia
 Rîșcani, Moldova

 Shirak Province, Armenia

M
Maladzyechna

 Bor, Russia
 Cherepovets, Russia
 Dąbrowa Białostocka, Poland

 Esslingen am Neckar, Germany
 Florești, Moldova
 Frunzensky (Saint Petersburg), Russia
 Irpin, Ukraine
 Kachkanar, Russia

 Kolomensky District, Russia
 Kolomna, Russia
 Kutno County, Poland
 Kuzminki (Moscow), Russia
 Lyubytinsky District, Russia

 Slavyansky District, Russia
 Sokółka, Poland
 Svetly, Russia
 Velingrad, Bulgaria

Mazyr

 Chojnice, Poland
 Korosten, Ukraine
 Oleksandriia, Ukraine
 Ovruch, Ukraine
 Severodvinsk, Russia

Minsk

 Abu Dhabi, United Arab Emirates
 Ankara, Turkey
 Bangalore, India
 Beijing, China
 Bishkek, Kyrgyzstan
 Bonn, Germany
 Changchun, China
 Chişinău, Moldova
 Detroit, United States
 Dushanbe, Tajikistan
 Eindhoven, Netherlands
 Gaziantep, Turkey
 Hanoi, Vietnam
 Havana, Cuba
 Ho Chi Minh City, Vietnam
 Islamabad, Pakistan
 Kaluga, Russia

 Murmansk, Russia
 Nizhny Novgorod, Russia

 Novosibirsk, Russia
 Rostov-on-Don, Russia
 Sendai, Japan
 Shanghai, China
 Shenzhen, China
 Tbilisi, Georgia
 Tehran, Iran
 Ufa, Russia
 Ulyanovsk, Russia

Mogilev

 Bursa, Turkey
 Changsha, China
 Eisenach, Germany
 Gabrovo, Bulgaria
 Kerch, Ukraine

 Kragujevac, Serbia
 Mykolaiv, Ukraine
 Nanjing, China
 Penza, Russia
 Sokolinaya Gora (Moscow), Russia
 Sumgait, Azerbaijan
 Tabriz, Iran
 Tula, Russia
 Villeurbanne, France
 Wittenberg, Germany

 Yuzhne, Ukraine
 Zhengzhou, China
 Zvenigorod, Russia

N
Navahrudak

 Bolsheboldinsky District, Russia
 Elbląg, Poland
 Halych, Ukraine
 Krynica Morska, Poland
 Prienai, Lithuania

Novopolotsk

 Chauffailles, France
 Dmitrovsky (Moscow), Russia
 Elektrostal, Russia
 Givors, France
 Kruševac, Serbia
 Kstovo, Russia
 Kursk, Russia

 Odintsovo, Russia
 Orekhovo-Zuyevo, Russia
 Ostrowiec Świętokrzyski, Poland
 Pantelej (Niš), Serbia
 Pavlovsk, Russia

 Pushkin, Russia
 Skadovsk, Ukraine
 Smiltene, Latvia
 Ventspils, Latvia

Nyasvizh

 Boyarka, Ukraine
 Carmel (Har Hevron), Israel
 Gatchinsky District, Russia
 Goris, Armenia
 Ismayilli, Azerbaijan
 Markivka Raion, Ukraine
 Odolanów, Poland
 Puławy, Poland
 Radviliškis, Lithuania
 Reutov, Russia
 Rosolini, Italy
 Silivri, Turkey
 Starobilsk Raion, Ukraine
 Zemun (Belgrade), Serbia
 Złotów, Poland

O
Orsha

 Asha, Russia
 Bălți, Moldova
 Bondeno, Italy
 Cherkasy, Ukraine
 Dubna, Russia
 Gagarin, Russia
 Ivanovo, Russia
 Ivanteyevka, Russia
 Kardymovsky District, Russia
 Koptevo (Moscow), Russia
 Krasnogvardeysky (Saint Petersburg), Russia
 Mārupe, Latvia
 Pernik, Bulgaria
 Qingdao, China
 Shishou, China
 Silifke, Turkey
 Spitak, Armenia
 Tver, Russia
 Vaulx-en-Velin, France
 Volgodonsk, Russia
 Vyazma, Russia
 Yiwu, China
 Zapadnoye Degunino (Moscow), Russia

P
Pinsk

 Altena, Germany
 Balakhna, Russia
 Dobrich, Bulgaria
 Domodedovo, Russia
 Hola Prystan, Ukraine
 Istra, Russia
 Kakhovka, Ukraine
 Kovel, Ukraine
 Ternopil, Ukraine
 Xiangyang, China

Polotsk

 Alaverdi, Armenia
 Bălți, Moldova
 Beskudnikovsky (Moscow), Russia
 Elektrostal, Russia
 Friedrichshafen, Germany
 Kamianets-Podilskyi, Ukraine
 Kansk, Russia
 Kursk, Russia
 Mingachevir, Azerbaijan
 Obukhiv, Ukraine
 Polevskoy, Russia
 Rēzekne Municipality, Latvia
 Rostov, Russia
 Sokol (Moscow), Russia
 Suoyarvsky District, Russia
 Tosno, Russia
 Tsqaltubo, Georgia
 Velikiye Luki, Russia

 Ventspils, Latvia

R
Rahachow

 Buzuluk, Russia
 Kotelniki, Russia

 Prachatice, Czech Republic
 Zviahel, Ukraine

Rechytsa

 Bălți, Moldova
 Belek (Serik), Turkey

 Kyustendil, Bulgaria
 Lgovsky District, Russia
 Myrhorod, Ukraine
 Ocnița District, Moldova
 Świdnik, Poland

S
Salihorsk

 Agarak (Meghri), Armenia
 Aleksin, Russia
 Ceadîr-Lunga, Moldova
 Chernyakhovsk, Russia
 Comrat, Moldova
 Holbæk, Denmark
 Kohtla-Järve, Estonia
 Lazarevsky (Sochi), Russia
 Lefortovo (Moscow), Russia

 Podolsky District, Russia
 Severo-Yeniseysky District, Russia
 Sol-Iletsky District, Russia
 Tarashcha Raion, Ukraine
 Volotovsky District, Russia
 Voskresensk, Russia
 Xianning, China

Shchuchyn

 Guryevsk, Russia
 Olecko County, Poland
 Szczuczyn, Poland

 Yuzhnoye Tushino (Moscow), Russia

Slawharad
 Arzamas, Russia

Slonim

 Aleksandrów Kujawski, Poland

 Czechowice-Dziedzice, Poland
 Gvardeysky District, Russia
 Jarocin, Poland

 Nieszawa, Poland
 Ogre, Latvia
 Sergiyev Posad, Russia
 Severnoye Tushino (Moscow), Russia
 Szypliszki, Poland
 Telenești District, Moldova
 Torzhok, Russia
 Tundzha, Bulgaria

Slutsk

 Brovary Raion, Ukraine
 Kalevalsky District, Russia
 Moshenskoy District, Russia
 Ryazansky (Moscow), Russia
 Rzhev, Russia
 Serpukhov, Russia
 Shaki, Azerbaijan
 Sisian, Armenia
 Staromaynsky District, Russia

Smalyavichy

 Basarabeasca, Moldova
 Belorechensk, Russia
 Gorna Oryahovitsa, Bulgaria
 Kagalnitsky District, Russia
 Myrhorod, Ukraine
 Mytishchi, Russia
 Września County, Poland
 Yiwu, China

Svietlahorsk

 Călărași District, Moldova
 Călărași, Romania
 Chernushinsky District, Russia
 Helmstedt, Germany
 Ivanteyevka, Russia

 Kingisepp, Russia
 Kommunar, Russia
 Mendip, England, United Kingdom
 Mtskheta, Georgia
 Obzor (Nesebar), Bulgaria
 Sliven, Bulgaria
 Svetly, Russia

Syanno

 Goszczanów, Poland
 Peschanokopsky District, Russia
 Pochinkovsky District, Russia
 Porkhovsky District, Russia

U
Uzda

 Grobiņa, Latvia
 Shatura, Russia
 Shimsky District, Russia
 Yovon, Tajikistan

V
Vitebsk

 Astrakhan, Russia
 Bălți, Moldova
 Beloyarsky District, Russia
 Daugavpils, Latvia
 Frankfurt an der Oder, Germany
 Gelendzhik, Russia
 Harbin, China
 Irkutsk, Russia
 Jinan, China
 Lipetsk, Russia
 Nienburg, Germany
 Niš, Serbia

 Pskov, Russia
 Rēzekne, Latvia
 Smolensk, Russia
 Vanadzor, Armenia
 Zielona Góra, Poland

Z
Zelva

 Dobrzyniewo Duże, Poland
 Jaunjelgava, Latvia
 Knyszyn, Poland

Zhlobin

 Scalenghe, Italy 
 Smederevo, Serbia
 Vyksa, Russia

Zhodzina

 Dalanzadgad, Mongolia
 Hîncești, Moldova
 Horishni Plavni, Ukraine
 Kajaran, Armenia

 Mytishchi, Russia
 Neryungrinsky District, Russia
 Olmaliq, Uzbekistan
 Oryol, Russia
 Panagyurishte, Bulgaria
 Plastovsky District, Russia
 Považská Bystrica, Slovakia
 Rustavi, Georgia

 Verkhnyaya Pyshma, Russia
 Zheleznogorsk, Russia

References

Belarus
Belarus geography-related lists
Foreign relations of Belarus
Populated places in Belarus
Cities in Belarus